James H. Floyd State Park is a 561-acre (2.27 km²) Georgia State Park located near Summerville at the base of Taylor Ridge (Georgia).  The park is named after Democrat James H. "Sloppy" Floyd who served in the Georgia House of Representatives from 1953 until 1974 and was from the area.  Surrounded by rural countryside and the Chattahoochee National Forest, the park offers many activities, including camping, hiking and fishing.  In addition, the park contains two lakes that total 51 acres (0.21 km²) and a children’s playground.  The Pinhoti Trail is accessible through the park.

Facilities
25 Tent/Trailer/RV Sites
4 Cottages (Log Cabins)
2 Playgrounds
1 Pioneer Campground
4 Picnic Shelters
4 Backcountry Campsites (coming soon)

Annual events
Lucky Cover Cruise In & BBQ (March) 
Twisted Ankle Marathon (May)
Outdoor Adventure Day (September)
Taylor Ridge Jamboree (October)

External links

State parks of Georgia (U.S. state)
State parks of the Appalachians
Protected areas of Chattooga County, Georgia